Gujarat Sahitya Sabha, originally called the Social and Literary Association is a literary institution for the promotion of Gujarati literature located in the city of Ahmedabad, India. It was founded by Ranjitram Vavabhai Mehta in 1898. Its name was later changed in 1905.

The main aim of the association is to celebrate the birth anniversaries of great Gujarati littérateurs, publishing and releasing books and also preserving manuscripts. The Gujarat Sahitya Sabha also gives an award called the Ranjitram Suvarna Chandrak since 1928 and is considered as the highest literary honour of the state of Gujarat.

List of presidents 
Following people served as presidents:

List of vice-presidents 
Following people served as vice-presidents:

See also
Gujarati Sahitya Parishad
Gujarat Vidhya Sabha
Gujarat Sahitya Akademi

References

Gujarati literature
Organisations based in Ahmedabad
Indic literature societies
Book publishing companies of India